John Laurence Menadue  (born 8 February 1935) is an Australian businessman and public commentator, and formerly a senior public servant and diplomat. He served as Secretary of the Department of Prime Minister and Cabinet from 1975 to 1976, working under the Whitlam and Fraser governments. He was later appointed by Malcolm Fraser as Australian Ambassador to Japan, in which position he served from 1977 to 1980. After which Menadue returned to Australia and was appointed the Secretary of the Department of Immigration and Ethnic Affairs from 1980 to 1983. Later, in 1983, he became the Secretary of the Department of the Special Minister of State and the Secretary of the Department of Trade.

Biography
Menadue was born in South Australia on 8 February 1935. 

From March 1960 to October 1967 Menadue was private secretary to Gough Whitlam, deputy leader of the Labor Opposition in the federal parliament (Whitlam became leader in February 1967).  In 1966 Menadue stood unsuccessfully as Labor candidate for the NSW federal seat of Hume.

Public service and diplomatic career
Menadue headed the Department of Prime Minister and Cabinet from 1974 to 1976, working under prime ministers Gough Whitlam and Malcolm Fraser.

He was Australian Ambassador to Japan from 1976 to 1980.

Menadue returned to Australia in 1980 to take up the position of Secretary of the Department of Immigration and Ethnic Affairs. In 1983, he was appointed Secretary of the Department of the Special Minister of State and Department of Trade.

Business career
Menadue worked as General Manager of News Limited from 1967 to 1974.

He was Chief Executive Officer of Qantas from June 1986 to July 1989.

In October 1999, Menadue published his autobiography Things You Learn Along the Way. He was the founding Chair of New Matilda (NewMatilda.com), an independent weekly online newsletter which was launched in August 2004. He is the founder and fellow of public-interest think tank, the Centre for Policy Development.  He also publishes the public affairs blogsite Pearls and Irritations.

Honours
Menadue was made an Officer of the Order of Australia (AO) in 1985 for public service. In 2003 he was awarded the Centenary Medal 'for service to Australian society through public service leadership'. In 1997, he received the Japanese Imperial Award, The Grand Cordon of the Order of the Sacred Treasure (Kun-itto Zuihō-shō), the highest honour awarded to foreigners who are not head of state or head of government.

Personal
Menadue was first married to Cynthia née Trowbridge with whom he had 4 children and one foster daughter.  Cynthia died of cancer in October 1984 aged 49. Menadue remarried to Susie in 1986 and he had two children with her.  Together they have fifteen grandchildren and five great-grandchildren.

Notes

References and external links

1935 births
Living people
Ambassadors of Australia to Japan
Australian public servants
Australian businesspeople
Officers of the Order of Australia
Recipients of the Centenary Medal
Secretaries of the Department of the Prime Minister and Cabinet
Secretaries of the Australian Government Immigration Department
20th-century Australian public servants